Mingrelian is a Kartvelian language that is mainly spoken in the Western Georgian regions Samegrelo and Abkhazia. In Abkhazia the number of Mingrelian speakers declined dramatically in the 1990s as a result of heavy ethnic cleansing of ethnic Georgians, the overwhelming majority of which were Mingrelians.

Mingrelian has two dialects: Zugdidi-Samurzaqano (northwestern) and Senaki-Martvili (southeastern). The dialects are extremely close to each other.

Grammatical cases
Mingrelian has nine grammatical cases. For pluralization the suffix -ep is used, which is inserted between stem and case marker.

Nouns
Mingrelian shares a noun classification scheme with other Kartvelian languages and classifies objects as:

 'Intelligent' entities (question mi? "who?")
 'Non-intelligent' entities (question mu? "what?)

Noun classification scheme

Noun declension

Declension of noun stem ḳoč ("man") in comparison to corresponding Laz ḳoč (id.), Georgian ḳac (id.) and Svan č'äš (husband) forms:

Adjectives
Adjectives in Mingrelian are declined like nouns.

Example of adjective declension
Declension of stem ǯveš ("old") in comparison to corresponding Laz (mǯveš), Georgian (ʒvel) and Svan (ǯwinel) forms:

Numerals

The Mingrelian numerals are almost identical to Laz with minor phonetic differences. The number system is vigesimal like in Georgian.

Cardinal numbers

Most of the Mingrelian cardinal numbers are inherited from Proto-Kartvelian language, except arti (one) and eči (twenty), which are considered as a Karto-Zan heritage, since there are no regular equivalents in Svan.

Ordinal numbers

In Mingrelian the circumfix ma-...-a produces ordinal numbers, which is a Common-Kartvelian heritage, since it has regular phonetical equivalents in Svan and Georgian (me-...-e in both)

Fractional numbers

The fractional numbers derivation rule in Mingrelian is akin to Old Georgian and Svan.

Pronouns

Personal pronouns

Possessive pronouns

Verbs
The Mingrelian verb has the categories of person, number, version, tense, mood, aspect, voice, and verbal focus.

Personality and number

In Mingrelian the verbs can be monovalent, bivalent or trivalent. This feature is also shared with other Kartvelian languages.

Monovalent verbs are represented only by subjective person and are always intransitive.
Bivalent verbs together with subject have also one object (direct or indirect). They are:
transitive in the case of direct object
intransitive if the object is indirect
Trivalent verbs have one subject and always both, direct and indirect objects and are ditransitive.

Table of verb personality

The person may be singular or plural.

Subject and object markers in Mingrelian are roughly the same as in Laz.

Subject markers

Object markers

In pre-consonant position the markers v- and g- may change phonetically:
v- → b- (in Zugdidi-Samurzaqano dialect)
g- → r- (in both dialects)

Version

In Mingrelian there are four types of version marking like in other Kartvelian languages:
subjective – shows that the action is intended for oneself,
objective – action is intended for another person,
objective-passive – the action is intended for another person and at the same time indicating the passiveness of subject,
neutral – neutral with respect to intention.

Tenses
In total there are 20 screeves in Mingrelian. They are grouped in four series.

Mood

Indicative

Indicative statement claims that the proposition should be taken as an apparent fact.

Interrogative

There are two ways to express interrogative mood:
with interrogative words, e.g. mi? (who?), mu? (what?), so? (where?), mužams? (when?), muč'o? (how?) etc. This rule is shared with other Kartvelian languages.
by attaching an interrogative particle -o to the end of a verb. Cf. the interrogative particles in Laz -i, Old Georgian -a and Svan -ma/-mo/-mu.

Imperative

Indicates a command or request. The aorist form is used when addressing 2nd person (singular/plural) and aorist optative in all other cases.

Subjunctive

Expresses possibility, wish, desire. The subjunctive mood in Mingrelian is provided by optative screeves.

Conditional

Indicates condition in contrary to a fact. It is produced by adding a verbal suffix -ḳo(ni) to the end of a verb.

Aspect
In Mingrelian the verbs may have two aspects depending on the completeness of action (perfective aspect) or the lack of it (imperfective aspect). The perfective aspect is derived by adding a preverb to the verb.

In 2nd, 3rd, 4th series the verbs equally have both aspect forms, while in the 1st series the screeves are distributed between two aspects.

References

. 

Grammar
Kartvelian grammars